Mira Yevgenyevna Redina (February 8, 1926  —  August 2011) was a ballet dancer, in 1944 to 1965 soloist of the Stanislavski and Nemirovich-Danchenko Moscow Academic Music Theatre. Starred in the movie  Russian Ballerina  (1947). Honored Artist of the RSFSR (1957).

Biography 
Mira Redina was born in Kaluga in Yevgeny Redin's family of February 8, 1926. She studied at the Moscow State Academy of Choreography, the class teachers Elizaveta Gerdt and  Maria Kozhukhova. Among her classmates were Raisa Struchkova and Violetta Bovt.   During the war, together with the school was evacuated to Vasilsursk.

After graduating in 1944, Redina joined the Moscow Musical Theatre  Stanislavsky and Nemirovich-Danchenko, where she danced until 1965. He performed principal roles in ballets by Nikolay Holfin, Alexey Chichinadze and Vladimir Burmeister.

References

External links

1926 births
2011 deaths
Russian ballerinas
Soviet film actresses
Soviet stage actresses
People from Kaluga
Honored Artists of the RSFSR
20th-century Russian ballet dancers
20th-century Russian women